Dillwynia glaucula, commonly known as Michelago parrot-pea, is a species of flowering plant in the family Fabaceae and is endemic to south-eastern New South Wales. It is an erect shrub with lenticels on the stems, linear, grooved leaves and yellow flowers with red markings.

Description

TaxonomyDillwynia glaucula was first formally described in 1998 by Peter Craig Jobson and Peter Henry Weston in the journal Telopea  from specimens they collected near Windellama in 1997. The specific epithet (glaucula) is the diminutive form of the Latin word glaucus meaning "bluish-green", and refers to the colour of the young leaves of this species.

Distribution and habitat
This dillwynia grows in woodland near Windellama, Michelago and Numeralla on the Southern Tablelands of New South Wales.

Conservation statusDillwynia glaucula is listed as "endangered" under the New South Wales Government Threatened Species Conservation Act 1995''.

References

glaucula
Fabales of Australia
Flora of New South Wales
Plants described in 1998